The Deserter (Dezertir) is a 1933 Soviet drama film directed by Vsevolod Pudovkin. It was his first sound picture.

Plot
Karl Renn, a Hamburg shipyard worker, is a member of the Communist Party of Germany and is commissioned by the USSR to organize a general strike and exert pressure on employers. When the strike comes, several fights take place with the police. After a month of strike, many workers are already so exhausted that they become strike-breakers. There arises an armed conflict that even Karl's wife goes to; but he stays at home because of his cowardice. Nevertheless, as a delegate of the party, he is sent together with four comrades to a meeting in the Soviet Union. He stays there, works in a blast furnace and is enthusiastic about the communist system. After a few weeks the news reaches him that his Party Chief in Hamburg had been slain. He then travels back to Germany to continue the struggle of the workers.

Cast
Boris Livanov - Karl Renn
Vasili Kovrigin - Ludwig Zelle
Aleksandr Chistyakov - Fritz Muller
Tamara Makarova - Greta Zelle 
Semyon Svashenko - Bruno
Dmitri Konsovsky - Strauss
Yudif Glizer - Marcella Zelle
M. Oleshchenko - Bertha	
Sergey Martinson - Passer-by
Maksim Shtraukh		
Sergei Gerasimov	
Sergei Komarov - Worker	
Vladimir Uralsky		
Ivan Lavrov - Richter
Ivan Chuvelyev
A. Besperstny

Reception

Grigori Roshal praised the stylistic aspects of the film; "The pattern of shots attains such vividness, one shot flowing into another, becoming fused one with the other, that ordinary shots create an extraordinary impression."
The New York Times gave a review which stated that "Pudovkin again demonstrates his ability to hold screen audiences, but be could have reduced the running time of "Deserter" by about fifteen minutes without lessening its value."
Graham Greene's review for The Spectator described it as "a bad film with some superb moments", nevertheless he also wrote; "But the film should be seen: there are moments magnificent as well as naive..."
Author and film critic Leonard Maltin awarded the film three and a half out of four stars, praising the film's visuals, and experimental use of sound, calling it "an essential visual and aural experience."

References

External links

1933 films
1933 drama films
Gorky Film Studio films
Films directed by Vsevolod Pudovkin
Films set in Hamburg
Films about the labor movement
Films shot in Moscow
Russian drama films
1930s Russian-language films
Soviet black-and-white films
Soviet drama films
Russian black-and-white films